Eupelor is a dubious genus of prehistoric amphibian belonging to the temnospondyl family Metoposauridae. Fossils have been found in present-day Pennsylvania, within the Newark Supergroup, dating to the Late Triassic (Norian).

Taxonomy
The Eupelor type species, E. durus, was named Mastodonsaurus durus by Edward Drinker Cope in 1866 on the basis of AMNH 3927, a number of clavicles and the tooth AMNH 2333 (which could have belonged to a different temnospondyl apart from Eupelor), from the Lockatong Formation (Phoenixville Tunnel site) of Phoenixville, Pennsylvania. In 1868 Cope allocated the species to its own genus, Eupelor, based on differences from Metoposaurus (then known as Metopias). 

Colbert and Imbrie (1956) reviewed all Triassic metoposaurids and concluded that Eupelor should be used for all metoposaurids from North America, especially Koskinonodon (now known as Anaschisma). The authors considered the trematosaur Calamops a possible synonym of Eupelor. Later, Chowdbury (1965) subsumed Eupelor into Metoposaurus along with other North American metoposaurids. Hunt (1993), however, treated Eupelor as a dubious genus of metoposaurid due to its non-diagnostic nature.

References

Triassic amphibians
Prehistoric amphibian genera
Trematosaurs